Darren Dennehy (born 21 September 1988) is an Irish former footballer who played as a defender for Everton, Cardiff City, Hereford United, Gillingham & Barnet in England, before returning home to play for Cork City, St Patrick's Athletic & Limerick in the League of Ireland Premier Division, alongside his older brother Billy at all three clubs.

Career

Everton
Born in County Kerry, Dennehy began his career at Everton progressing from the youth system, but did not make a first team appearance at the club. In July 2008, Dennehy was left go by Everton and joined Championship side Cardiff City on a free transfer.

Cardiff City
After not making a first team appearance at Cardiff during the season, Dennehy spent two weeks training at League One side Hereford United before signing on a one-month loan deal, making his debut the following day in a 1–0 defeat against Southend United. He made just two more appearances for Hereford, in consecutive 3–0 defeats to Scunthorpe United and Swindon Town, before his season was ended when he contracted glandular fever while away with the Republic of Ireland under-21 side.

After returning to Cardiff for the remainder of the 2008–09 season he rejoined Hereford on a six-month loan deal in July 2009, where he made a total of ten appearances in all competitions before returning to Cardiff in late December. On 21 January he joined Football League One side Gillingham on loan. He made his debut for the Gills on 23 January 2010 in a goalless draw with Colchester United and played in all seven matches he was available for during his loan spell before extending his loan deal until late April, returning to Cardiff on 29 April.

Barnet
On 12 July 2010, Dennehy joined Football League Two side Barnet on a free transfer, making his debut on the opening day of the 2010–11 season in a 2–1 defeat to Chesterfield.  Dennehy missed the rest of the 2010–11 season after sustaining a foot injury in the 3–1 home win against Cheltenham Town on 4 September 2010. Dennehy made his comeback in the Football League Trophy victory against Colchester United a year later. In May 2012, Dennehy left Barnet due to the expiry of his contract.

Cork City
On 12 January 2013 Dennehy signed for League of Ireland club Cork City. His brother Billy Dennehy also signed for City for the 2014 season after being released by Shamrock Rovers. After 2 successive seasons as runners up in the league to Dundalk, as well as 2015 FAI Cup runners up to the same opposition, it was announced that the two Dennehy brothers would not remain at Cork for the 2016 season.

St Patrick's Athletic
On 9 December 2015, Dennehy signed for Dublin club St Patrick's Athletic, along with older brother Billy.

Career statistics
Correct as of 10 April 2021.

Honours

St Patrick's Athletic
League of Ireland Cup (1): 2016

References

External links

Darren Dennehy profile at the Cardiff City website

1988 births
Living people
People from Tralee
Association footballers from County Kerry
Republic of Ireland association footballers
Republic of Ireland under-21 international footballers
Republic of Ireland youth international footballers
Association football defenders
Everton F.C. players
Cardiff City F.C. players
Hereford United F.C. players
Gillingham F.C. players
Barnet F.C. players
English Football League players
Cork City F.C. players
St Patrick's Athletic F.C. players
Limerick F.C. players
League of Ireland players